Twin cities are a special case of two neighboring cities or urban centres that grow into a single conurbation – or narrowly separated urban areas – over time. There are no formal criteria, but twin cities are generally comparable in status and size, though not necessarily equal; a city and a substantially smaller suburb would not typically qualify, even if they were once separate. Tri-cities and quad cities are similar phenomena involving three or four municipalities.

A common – but not universal – scenario is two cities that developed concurrently on opposite sides of a river. For example, Minneapolis and Saint Paul in Minnesota – one of the most widely known pairs of "Twin Cities" – were founded several miles apart on opposite sides of the Mississippi River, and competed for prominence as they grew.

In some cases, twin cities are separated by a state border, such as Albury (New South Wales) and Wodonga (Victoria) in Australia, on opposite sides of the Murray River. Islamabad and Rawalpindi are the twin cities of Pakistan; Islamabad is the Federal Territory of Pakistan, while Rawalpindi is a city in the Punjab province. Cities on opposite sides of international borders sometimes share enough cultural and historical identity to be seen as twins, such as Haparanda (Sweden) and Tornio (Finland), Leticia (Colombia) and Tabatinga (Brazil), or Valga (Estonia) and Valka (Latvia).

In some cases twin cities eventually merge into a single legal municipality, such as Buda and Pest merging in 1873 into Budapest, Hungary, Brooklyn being annexed by New York City in 1898, or the three ancient cities of Hankou, Hanyang, and Wuchang joining in 1927 into Wuhan, China.

As a single urban area, twin cities may share an airport whose airport codes include both cities' initials, e.g., DFW (Dallas–Fort Worth), LBA (Leeds–Bradford), MSP (Minneapolis–Saint Paul), RDU (Raleigh and Durham), and CAK (Akron–Canton).

Examples

Africa

Ghana 
 Sekondi-Takoradi

Zambia / Zimbabwe 
 Victoria Falls, Zimbabwe and Livingstone, Zambia

South Africa 
Johannesburg and Pretoria, Gauteng Province

International 
 Kinshasa and Brazzaville

North America

Canada 
 Halifax and Dartmouth in Nova Scotia
 Kitchener and Waterloo, Ontario 
 Battleford and North Battleford, Saskatchewan "The Battlefords"

United States 
 Texarkana, Arkansas and Texarkana, Texas
 Hartford and New Britain, Connecticut
 Fort Myers and Cape Coral, Florida
 Fort Lauderdale and Miami
 St. Petersburg and Tampa, Florida 
 Champaign and Urbana, Illinois
Bloomington and Normal, Illinois
 Lewiston and Auburn, Maine
 Houghton and Hancock, Michigan.
 Duluth, Minnesota, and Superior, Wisconsin 
 Minneapolis and Saint Paul, Minnesota
 Natchez, Mississippi and Vidalia, Louisiana
 Crystal City, Missouri and Festus, Missouri

 Raleigh and Durham, North Carolina
 Winston-Salem and Greensboro, North Carolina (Winston-Salem itself was formerly a pair of twin cities, until the two merged)
 Fargo, North Dakota, and Moorhead, Minnesota
 Grand Forks, North Dakota  and East Grand Forks, Minnesota
 Portland, Oregon and Vancouver, Washington
 Scranton and Wilkes-Barre, Pennsylvania 
 Allentown and Bethlehem, Pennsylvania
 Greenville and Spartanburg, South Carolina
 Bristol, Tennessee and Bristol, Virginia
 Dallas and Fort Worth, Texas
 Midland and Odessa, Texas 
 Bluefield, Virginia and Bluefield, West Virginia
Memphis, Tennessee and West Memphis, Arkansas
Fort Collins and Loveland, Colorado

International 
Examples, sharing names or similar names, across an international border include:
Canada–United States border
 Niagara Falls, Ontario, Canada; Niagara Falls, New York, United States
 Sault Ste. Marie, Ontario, Canada; Sault Ste. Marie, Michigan, United States
 North Portal, Saskatchewan, Canada; Portal, North Dakota, United States
Mexico–United States border
 Tecate, Baja California, Mexico; Tecate, California, United States
 Boquillas del Carmen, Coahuila, Mexico; Boquillas, Texas, United States
 Naco, Sonora, Mexico; Naco, Arizona, United States
 Nogales, Sonora, Mexico; Nogales, Arizona, United States
 San Luis Río Colorado, Sonora, Mexico; San Luis, Arizona, United States
 Nuevo Laredo, Tamaulipas, Mexico; Laredo, Texas, United States
 Nuevo Progreso, Río Bravo, Tamaulipas, Mexico; Progreso, Texas, United States 
 Calexico, California, United States; Mexicali, Baja California, Mexico; see Calexico–Mexicali

Pairs with unrelated names:
Mexico–Guatemala border
 Ciudad Hidalgo, Chiapas, Mexico and Ayutla, San Marcos, Guatemala
United States–Canada border
 Detroit, Michigan, United States and Windsor, Ontario, Canada; see Detroit–Windsor
 International Falls, Minnesota, United States and Fort Frances, Ontario, Canada
United States–Mexico border
 Douglas, Arizona, United States and Agua Prieta, Sonora, Mexico
 Yuma, Arizona, United States and San Luis Río Colorado, Sonora, Mexico
 San Diego, California, United States and Tijuana, Baja California, Mexico; see San Diego–Tijuana
 Brownsville, Texas, United States and Matamoros, Tamaulipas, Mexico; see Brownsville–Matamoros
 Del Rio, Texas, United States and Ciudad Acuña, Coahuila, Mexico
 Eagle Pass, Texas, United States and Piedras Negras, Coahuila, Mexico
 El Paso, Texas, United States and Ciudad Juárez, Chihuahua, Mexico; see El Paso–Juárez
 Presidio, Texas, United States and Manuel Ojinaga, Chihuahua, Mexico

Historic 
 Lloydminster, Alberta/Saskatchewan, Canada
 Thunder Bay, Ontario, Canada
Saginaw and East Saginaw, Michigan, United States
 Brooklyn and New York City, New York, United States

South America

Argentina 
 Carmen de Patagones and Viedma
 Paraná, Entre Ríos and Santa Fe

Brazil 
 Americana, São Paulo and Santa Bárbara d'Oeste
 Juazeiro and Petrolina
 Olinda and Recife
 Vila Velha and Vitória

Chile 
 Concepción and Talcahuano
 Coquimbo and La Serena
 Valparaiso and Viña del Mar

Peru 
 Callao and Lima

Venezuela 
 Acarigua and Araure
 Guarenas and Guatire

Asia

Current 
Bangladesh
 Dhaka and Narayanganj, Bangladesh
Mainland China
 Guangzhou and Foshan, China
 Xi'an and Xianyang, China
 Beijing and Langfang, China
 Wuxi and Suzhou, China
 Chaozhou and Shantou, China
 Haifeng and Lufeng, China
Hong Kong
 Sheung Shui and Fanling
 Tsuen Wan and Kwai Chung
India
 Ahmedabad and Gandhinagar, India
 Allahabad and Naini, India
 Aurangabad and Jalna, India
 Bangalore and Hosur, India
 Chümoukedima and Dimapur, India
 Cuttack and Bhubaneswar, India
 Durg and Bhilai, India
 Hubli and Dharwad, India
 Mysore and Srirangapatna, Karnataka, India
 Kankroli and Rajsamand, India
 Kochi and Ernakulam, India
 Coimbatore and Tiruppur
 Kolkata and Howrah, India
 Mumbai and Navi Mumbai, Maharashtra, India
 Mumbai and Thane, Maharashtra, India
 Munger and Jamalpur, India
 Noida and Greater Noida, India
 Pondicherry and Cuddalore, India
 Pune and Pimpri-Chinchwad, Maharashtra, India
 Ranchi and Hatia, India
 Sangli and Miraj, Maharashtra, India
 Surat and Navsari, India
 Thrissur and Guruvayur, India
 Vijayawada and Guntur, Andhra Pradesh, India
 Bangarpet and Kolar Gold Fields, Karnataka, India
 Harihar and Davangere, Karnataka, India
 Shivamoga and Bhadravati, Karnataka, India
 Arcot and Ranipet, Tamil Nadu, India
 Attur and Narasingapuram, Tamil Nadu, India
 Bhavani and Komarapalayam, Tamil Nadu, India
 Dharmapuri and Nallampalli, Tamil Nadu, India
 Erode and Pallipalayam, Tamil Nadu, India
 Namakkal and Karur, Tamil Nadu, India
 Pallavaram and Chromepet, Tamil Nadu, India
 Tiruchirappalli and Srirangam, Tamil Nadu, India
 Tirunelveli and Palayamkottai, Tamil Nadu, India
 Hyderabad and Secunderabad, Telangana state, India
 Asansol and Durgapur, West Bengal, India
 Barrackpore and Barasat, West Bengal, India
 Coochbehar and Alipurduar, West Bengal, India
 Jalpaiguri and Mainaguri, West Bengal, India
 Siliguri and Jalpaiguri, West Bengal, India
Iraq
 Erbil and Mosul, Iraq
 Seleucia and Ctesiphon, Iraq
Israel 
 Ramla and Lod, Israel
 Tel Aviv and Jaffa, Israel
Japan
 Aomori and Hakodate, Japan
 Kamisu and Kashima, Japan 
 Kitakyushu and Shimonoseki, Japan
 Kyoto and Otsu, Japan
 Maebashi and Takasaki, Japan
 Nasushiobara and Otawara, Japan 
 Okayama and Kurashiki, Japan 
 Osaka and Sakai, Japan
 Sanjo and Tsubame, Japan
 Toyohashi and Toyokawa, Japan
 Tsukuba and Tsuchiura, Japan 
 Yokkaichi and Suzuka, Japan
Lebanon
 Beirut and Jounieh, Lebanon
Nepal
 Bharatpur and Gaindakot, Nepal
 Butwal and Tilottama, Nepal
 Nepalgunj and Kohalpur, Nepal
North Korea
 Rason and Chongjin
Pakistan
 Jhelum and Sarai Alamgir, Pakistan
 Peshawar and Mardan, Pakistan
 Rawalpindi and Islamabad, Pakistan
Palestine
 Ramallah and al-Bireh, Palestine
Philippines
 Dipolog and Dapitan, Philippines
Saudi Arabia
 Dammam and Khobar, Saudi Arabia
South Korea
 Seoul and Incheon, South Korea
 Busan and Ulsan, South Korea
 Sejong City and Daejeon, South Korea
 Yangyang and Sokcho, South Korea
Taiwan
 Taipei and New Taipei, Taiwan
Thailand
 Bangkok and Nonthaburi, Thailand
 Chiang Mai and Lamphun, Thailand
 Songkhla and Hatyai, Thailand
Vietnam
 Ho Chi Minh City and Binh Duong, Vietnam
International
 Astara, Azerbaijan and Astara, Iran
 Dandong, China and Sinuiju, North Korea
 Manzhouli, China and Zabaykalsk, Russia
 Heihe, China and Blagoveshchensk, Russia

Historic 
 Victoria and Kowloon, colonial Hong Kongalthough, in both colonial Hong Kong and the Hong Kong Special Administrative Region, Victoria is the only city recognised by law; they were widely considered to be separate cities until at least the mid-1970s
 Chirala-Perala, India
 Ise, Japan (merger of Uji, Yamada)
 Joetsu, Japan (merger of Takada, Naoetsu)
 Naha and Shuri, Okinawa, Japan, once separate cities, Shuri became integrated as a district of Naha
 Wuhan, China (merger of Wuchang, Hankou, Hanyang)
 Saigon and Cholon, Vietnam, merged into Saigon-Cholon, now Ho Chi Minh City.

Europe

Current 

Denmark
 Nørresundby and Aalborg, Denmark
France
 Frejus and Saint-Raphaël, France
 Lyon and Villeurbanne, France
Germany
 Frankfurt and Offenbach, Germany
 Ludwigshafen and Mannheim, Germany
 Mainz and Wiesbaden, Germany
 Nuremberg and Fuerth, Germany
 Sindelfingen and Böblingen, Germany
 Ulm and Neu-Ulm, Germany
Ireland
 Ballybofey and Stranorlar, in County Donegal, Ireland are often called the Twin Towns and form the census town, Ballybofey and Stranorlar
Norway
 Fredrikstad and Sarpsborg, Norway
 Porsgrunn and Skien, Norway
 Sandnes and Stavanger, Norway
Poland
 Bydgoszcz and Toruń, Poland
 Kalisz and Ostrów Wielkopolski, Poland
Portugal
 Porto and Vila Nova de Gaia, Portugal
 Póvoa de Varzim and Vila do Conde, Portugal
Serbia
 Novi Sad and Petrovaradin, Serbia
 Temerin and Bački Jarak, Serbia
 Zemun and New Belgrade, Serbia
Spain
 Alcobendas and San Sebastián de los Reyes, Spain
 Aldaia and Alaquàs, Spain
 Coslada and San Fernando de Henares, Spain
 Elda and Petrer, Spain
 Llombai and Catadau, Spain
 Santa Cruz de Tenerife and San Cristóbal de la Laguna, Spain
Sweden
 Jönköping and Huskvarna, Sweden
Ukraine
 Donetsk and Makiivka, Ukraine
United Kingdom
 Bournemouth and Poole, United Kingdom
 Brighton and Hove, United Kingdom
 Chatham and Rochester, United Kingdom
 Chester, England and Saltney, Wales
 Leeds and Bradford, United Kingdom
 Manchester and Salford, United Kingdom
 Newcastle upon Tyne and Gateshead, England 
 Liverpool and Birkenhead, England
 Kingston upon Hull and Grimsby, England

International 
Austria–Slovakia border
 Vienna, Austria and Bratislava, Slovakia
Austria–Slovenia border
 Bad Radkersburg, Austria and Gornja Radgona, Slovenia 
Belgium–France border
 Comines, Belgium and Comines, France
 Mouscron, Belgium and Tourcoing, France
 Wervik, Belgium and Wervicq-Sud, France
Croatia–Bosnia and Herzegovina border
 Slavonski Brod, Croatia and Bosanski Brod, Bosnia and Herzegovina
Czech Republic–Poland border
 Těšín, Czech Republic and Cieszyn, Poland
Denmark–Sweden border
 Copenhagen, Denmark and Malmö, Sweden
Estonia–Latvia border
 Valga, Estonia and Valka, Latvia
Estonia–Russia border
 Narva, Estonia and Ivangorod, Russia
Finland–Russia border
 Imatra, Finland and Svetogorsk, Russia
Finland–Sweden border
 Tornio, Finland and Haparanda, Sweden
France–Germany border
 Strasbourg, France and Kehl, Germany
France–Spain border
 Hendaye, France and Irun, Spain
Germany–Poland border
 Frankfurt (Oder), Germany and Słubice, Poland
 Görlitz, Germany and Zgorzelec, Poland 
 Guben, Germany and Gubin, Poland
 Heringsdorf, Germany and Świnoujście, Poland
Germany–Switzerland border
 Konstanz, Germany and Kreuzlingen, Switzerland
 Laufenburg (Baden), Germany and Laufenburg,_Aargau, Switzerland, separated between the Rhine River (used to be one city until 1801/1802).
Hungary–Slovakia border
 Esztergom, Hungary and Štúrovo, Slovakia
 Komárno, Slovakia and Komárom, Hungary
Ireland–United Kingdom border
 Strabane, Northern Ireland and Lifford, Ireland
Italy–Slovenia border
 Gorizia, Italy and Nova Gorica, Slovenia
The Netherlands–Germany border
 Kerkrade, The Netherlands and Herzogenrath, Germany
Spain–Gibraltar border
 La Línea de la Concepción, Spain and Gibraltar
Switzerland–Germany-France border
 Basel, Switzerland and Weil am Rhein, Germany and Saint Louis, France

Historic 
 Knokke and Heist-aan-Zee. United into Knokke-Heist, Belgium.
 Gradec and Kaptol. United into Zagreb, Croatia.
 Frýdek and Místek. United into Frýdek-Místek, Czech Republic.
 Barmen and Elberfeld, Germany. United into Wuppertal.
 West Berlin, West Germany and East Berlin, East Germany. United into Berlin, Germany. 
 Buda and Pest. United into Budapest, Hungary.
 Bielsko and Biała, Poland. United into Bielsko-Biała.
 City of London and City of Westminster, England. Absorbed into London, United Kingdom.
 Berwick-upon-Tweed and Tweedmouth, until the former was taken by England from Scotland.

Oceania 
 Albury and Wodonga, Australia
 Canberra and Queanbeyan, Australia
 Darwin and Palmerston, Australia
 Forster and Tuncurry, Australia
 Gold Coast and Tweed Heads, Australia
 Harden and Murrumburrah, Australia
 Kalgoorlie and Boulder, Australia
 Napier and Hastings, New Zealand
 Perth and Fremantle, Australia
 Townsville and Thuringowa, Australia

Tri-cities 

Australia
 Brisbane; Gold Coast; and Sunshine Coast, Queensland, Australia — see South East Queensland
 Sydney; Wollongong; and Newcastle, Australia in the geological region known as the Sydney Basin
Canada
 The Tri-cities of British Columbia consist of Coquitlam, Port Coquitlam, and Port Moody
 The Tri-citites of Kitchener; Waterloo; and Cambridge, Ontario, Canada, the cities' collective metropolitan area is often called the K-W Tri-City Area
 Tri-Town, Ontario, Canada - Cobalt, Haileybury and New Liskeard
China
 Xiamen, Quanzhou, Zhangzhou, Fujian
India
 Chandigarh; Mohali; and Panchkula, India
 Vijayawada; Amaravati; and Guntur, India
 Warangal; Hanamkonda; Kazipet in India — see Warangal Tri-City
Japan
 Kyoto; Osaka; Kobe - see Keihanshin
Malaysia
 Parit Buntar, Perak; Nibong Tebal, Penang; and Bandar Baharu, Kedah
Mexico
 Guadalajara; Tlaquepaque; Zapopan, Jalisco, Mexico
Nepal
 Bhaktapur; Kathmandu; and Patan, Nepal
 Tricity, Nepal, consisting of the cities of Baglung, Beni and Kushma
Philippines
 Cebu City; Mandaue; and Lapu-Lapu City, the Philippines
Poland
 Gdańsk; Gdynia; and Sopot, Poland — see Tricity, Poland
 Wejherowo; Rumia; and Reda, Poland — see Kashubian Tricity
Saudi Arabia
 The Dammam metropolitan area, consisting of Dammam; Dhahran; and Khobar, Saudi Arabia
South Africa
 The metropolitan municipalities of Johannesburg, Tshwane (Pretoria) and Ekurhuleni (East Rand), Gauteng Province
 Gqeberha (Port Elizabeth), Kariega (Uitenhage) and Despatch in Nelson Mandela Bay Metropolitan Municipality, Eastern Cape Province
 East London, Bhisho and Qonce ( King William's Town) in Buffalo City Metropolitan Municipality, Eastern Cape Province
Sudan
 Khartoum; North Khartoum; and Omdurman, Sudan
Sweden
 Stockholm; Solna; and Sundbyberg, Sweden
 Trollhättan; Uddevalla; and Vänersborg, Sweden
United Arab Emirates
 The Dubai-Sharjah-Ajman metropolitan area, consisting of Dubai; Sharjah; and Ajman, United Arab Emirates
United States
 Burbank; Glendale; and Pasadena, in Los Angeles County, California, United States
 Fremont; Newark; and Union City, in Alameda County, California, United States
 Oceanside; Vista; and Carlsbad, in San Diego County, California, United States
 Riverside; San Bernardino; and Ontario, California, United States, the cities' collective metropolitan area is often called the Inland Empire
 San Jose; San Francisco; and Oakland, California, United States
 College Park; East Point; and Hapeville, Georgia, United States, all of which are near Hartsfield–Jackson Atlanta International Airport
 Geneva; Batavia; and St. Charles, in Kane County, Illinois, United States, also known as Tri-Cities, Illinois
 Bay City; Saginaw; and Midland, Michigan, United States, the cities' collective metropolitan area is often called the Greater Tri Cities, the Great Lakes Bay Region or the MBS region
 Ferrysburg; Grand Haven; and Spring Lake, Michigan, United States
 Iron River, Caspian, and Gaastra, Michigan, United States
 Ironwood; Bessemer; and Wakefield, Michigan, United States
 Grand Island; Kearney; and Hastings, in south-central Nebraska, United States, also known as Tri-Cities, Nebraska
 Rochester; Dover; and Somersworth, New Hampshire, United States
 Farmington; Bloomfield; and Aztec, New Mexico, United States
 Albany, Troy, and Schenectady, New York, United States, in the region known as the Capital District
 Binghamton; Endicott; and Johnson City, New York, United States, the cities' collective metropolitan area is often called the Triple Cities
 New York, New York; Newark; and Jersey City, New Jersey, United States
 Greensboro; Winston-Salem; and High Point, North Carolina, United States, the cities' collective metropolitan area is often called the Piedmont Triad
 Raleigh; Durham; and Chapel Hill, North Carolina, United States, the cities' collective metropolitan area is often called the Research Triangle
 Tuttle; Newcastle; and Blanchard, Oklahoma, United States, also known as the Tri-City Area
 Johnson City; Kingsport; and Bristol, Tennessee/Bristol, Virginia, United States, also known as Tri-Cities, Tennessee
 Beaumont; Port Arthur; and Orange, Texas, United States, also known as the Golden Triangle (Texas)
 Dallas; Fort Worth; and Arlington, Texas, United States
 Petersburg; Colonial Heights; and Hopewell, Virginia, United States, also known as Tri-Cities, Virginia
 Pasco; Richland; and Kennewick, Washington, United States, also known as Tri-Cities, Washington

Quad cities 
China
 Xinhui, Taishan, Kaiping, and Enping together formed Siyi area in Jiangmen, Guangdong
Finland
 Helsinki, Espoo, Kauniainen and Vantaa in Uusimaa, Finland; together form the largest metropolis in the country and its actual capital area.
Thailand
 Pattaya-Chonburi Metropolitan Area consists of the City of Pattaya, Town of Chonburi, Portal town of Laem Chabang and Town of Sattahip on the west coast of Chonburi Province, Thailand
United Kingdom
 The West Yorkshire Built-up Area consists of the cities of Leeds, Bradford and Wakefield, and the large town of Huddersfield, United Kingdom.
United States
 The Florence-Muscle Shoals Metropolitan Area in Alabama, United States, is locally referred to as "the Quad Cities", with Florence, Muscle Shoals, Sheffield, and Tuscumbia, Alabama. Formerly, when Muscle Shoals was a mere village, this region was known as "Tri-Cities", Alabama. In fact, all except Florence are incorporated as towns.
 Quad Cities of Davenport and Bettendorf, Iowa, and Rock Island and Moline, Illinois, United States. It also includes a fifth member, East Moline, Illinois.
 Allentown/Bethlehem, Pennsylvania and Easton, Pennsylvania/Phillipsburg, New Jersey, United States; the collective area is often called the Lehigh Valley
 The Quad Cities of Minnesota, United States, consist of Virginia, Eveleth, Gilbert, and Mountain Iron.
 The cities of Pullman, Washington, Moscow, Idaho, Lewiston, Idaho and Clarkston, Washington, United States, have marketed themselves as "Quad Cities."

More than four cities 
Denmark
 The Triangle Region (Denmark), consisting of Billund, Fredericia, Haderslev, Kolding, Middelfart, Vejen and Vejle, Denmark.
Germany
 The Ruhr district (Germany): consisting of Dortmund, Essen, Duisburg, Bochum, Oberhausen, Mülheim, Bottrop, Gelsenkirchen and Herne in its core.
India
 In India: the cities of New Delhi, Noida, Greater Noida, Ghaziabad, Gurgaon and Faridabad have formed a huge metropolitan area known as National Capital Region (India).
Malaysia
 In Malaysia: the cities of Kuala Lumpur, Petaling Jaya, Subang Jaya, Puchong, Shah Alam, Klang, Port Klang, Putrajaya, Cyberjaya, and Kajang have formed a huge metropolitan area (around the size of Singapore) known as Greater Kuala Lumpur.
Kazakhstan
 In Kazakhstan: the cities of Karaganda, Temirtau, Shakhtinsk, Abai, Saran, Topar, Dolinka, Shahan, Kokpekti, and Novodolinsky form an industrial-mining area known since Soviet times as Karbass (Karaganda coal basin).
United States
 In the US states of Illinois and Iowa: The cities of Davenport and Bettendorf in Iowa; Rock Island, Moline and East Moline in Illinois form a metropolitan area known as the Quad Cities.
 The Michiana area, in the states of Indiana and Michigan, consisting of the cities of South Bend, Mishawaka, Elkhart, Granger, Michigan City, Goshen, La Porte (Indiana), New Buffalo, Buchanan, Niles, Berrien Springs, St. Joseph, Benton Harbor, and Dowagiac (Michigan)
 In the US states of Michigan and Wisconsin sit the 6 cities of Iron Mountain, Kingsford, Quinnesec, Norway (in Michigan), Aurora, and Niagara (in Wisconsin). The area is collectively known as the Iron Mountain Area.
 In the US state of Virginia: Norfolk, Chesapeake, Hampton, Newport News, Portsmouth, Suffolk, and Virginia Beach; the cities' collective metropolitan area is often called Hampton Roads

Examples of cities formed by amalgamation

Asia 
China
 Wuhan in China consists of the towns of Wuchang, Hankou, and Hanyang in Hubei Province.
India
 Delhi, India: What used to be Old Delhi, New Delhi, and a collection of smaller villages has now grown into the current megalopolis that is seen today, also known as the National Capital Region (NCR)
 In Telangana, India, the cities of Hyderabad and Secunderabad are merged to form Greater Hyderabad.
Japan
 Fukuoka in Japan, a city of 1.4 million people, formerly the twin cities of Hakata and Fukuoka until the late 19th century.
 Kitakyushu in Japan, a city of 900,000 people, created in 1963 by the merger of Yahata, Kokura, Moji, Wakamatsu, and Tobata.  Yahata and Kokura had formerly been major cities in their own right.
 Saitama in Japan, a city of 1.2 million people, created in 2001 by the merger of the cities of Urawa, Omiya, Yono, and later Iwatsuki.  Urawa and Omiya could formerly have been considered twin cities.
Pakistan
 Islamabad, the capital city of Pakistan, has been expanded to include smaller towns including Rawat in its territory. 
 Lahore, the second largest city of Pakistan, has, as of 2013, grown out so much that small towns by this giant city, such as Shahdara, have been absorbed in its city limits.
Taiwan
 The former cities of Taoyuan and Zhongli, Taiwan, which merged along with the entire county in 2014 to form a single municipality city of Taoyuan, the two cities sit directly next to each other and shares almost the same population.
Thailand
 Bangkok, the capital and largest city of Thailand, was created in 1971, when the previous Bangkok province (Phra Nakhon) was merged with Thonburi province.
Vietnam
 The cities of Saigon and Cholon merged in 1931 to form a single city named Saigon-Cholon; in 1956, the name Cholon was dropped and the city became known as Saigon (now Ho Chi Minh City), Vietnam.

Europe 
Germany
 Berlin (Berlin and Cölln), in Germany
 Duisburg (Duisburg and Hamborn, 1929–1935 called Duisburg-Hamborn), in North Rhine-Westphalia, Germany
 Wuppertal (Barmen and Elberfeld), in North Rhine-Westphalia, Germany
Greece
 Athens incorporated dozens of villages and towns and absorbed whole of Athens basin and parts outside of it, notably Piraeus.
Hungary
 Budapest, Hungary is the amalgamation of Buda, Pest and Óbuda.
The Netherlands
 Eindhoven, the Netherlands, merged with five neighbouring municipalities (Woensel, Tongelre, Stratum, Gestel en Blaarthem and Strijp) into the new Groot-Eindhoven ("Greater Eindhoven") in 1920. The prefix "Groot-" was later dropped.
Spain
 Madrid, Spain, evolved by absorption of other towns (like Tetuán de las Victorias, Vallecas, Chamartín de la Rosa or Aravaca)
United Kingdom
 Edinburgh, Scotland, absorbed a number of surrounding villages, but most notably the separate burgh of Leith.
 London, England, grew from its cores in the City of London and the City of Westminster to encompass many other towns and villages within neighbouring counties and absorbed almost the whole of Middlesex county.
 Manchester and the city of Salford, England in the Metropolitan County of Greater Manchester (formerly in Lancashire).
 Stoke-on-Trent, England was created in 1910 from the towns of Burslem, Hanley, Tunstall, Longton, Fenton and Stoke, taking its name from the latter. Neighbouring Newcastle-under-Lyme remains a separate town.

North America 

Canada
 Port Alberni, British Columbia, Canada, was formed in 1967 when Alberni and Port Alberni, merged to become one city.
 Winnipeg, Manitoba, Canada, amalgamated with 12 surrounding municipalities and its metropolitan corporation in 1971 under what was referred to as unicity reforms in local government restructuring.
 Halifax and Dartmouth, Nova Scotia, Canada, were merged in 1996 along with Bedford and Halifax County to create the Halifax Regional Municipality.
 Greater Sudbury, Ontario, Canada, was formed in 2001 by the amalgamation of the former Regional Municipality of Sudbury, comprising the municipalities of Sudbury, Nickel Centre, Valley East, Capreol, Rayside-Balfour, Onaping Falls and Walden, plus a number of previously unamalgamated townships. The amalgamation made it the most populous city in the Northern Ontario region.
 Kingston, Ontario, Canada, was amalgamated in 1998 with the neighboring Kingston and Pittsburgh Townships.
 Ottawa, Ontario, Canada, was given its large area by the amalgamation in 2001 of the old City of Ottawa, the suburbs of Nepean, Kanata, Gloucester, Rockcliffe Park, Vanier and Cumberland, Orleans, and the rural townships of West Carleton, Osgoode, Rideau, and Goulbourn
 Toronto, Ontario, Canada, formed by an amalgamation of the Old Toronto with East York, Etobicoke, North York, Scarborough and York, which were themselves products of earlier amalgamations.
 Thunder Bay, Ontario, Canada (Fort William and Port Arthur).
 Gatineau, Quebec, Canada, formed by the amalgamation of the old City of Gatineau, City of Hull, City of Aylmer, City of Buckingham and the Municipality of Masson-Angers all facing the City of Ottawa, Ontario from the north shore of the Ottawa River.
 Montreal, Quebec, Canada, was merged with the other 27 communities on the Island of Montreal by an act in the Quebec Parliament in 2002. Following a change in the provincial government, several communities later voted via referendum to de-merge and there are now a total of 15, leaving Montreal merged with the other 12.
 Saguenay, Quebec, Canada (Chicoutimi, Jonquière, et al.)
 Lloydminster, Canada, on the Saskatchewan-Alberta border, was formed as a single entity in 1903, when both future provinces were part of the Northwest Territories, but was divided into two separate entities in 1905 because the border between the newly created provinces bisected the community. In 1930, the two towns were reunited as a single town under the shared jurisdiction of both provinces, and Lloydminster was reincorporated as a single city in 1958.
United States
 Helena–West Helena, Arkansas was formed in 2006 by the merger of the previous cities of Helena and West Helena.
 Fremont, California was formed in 1956 by the combination of the five towns of Centerville, Irvington, Niles, Mission San Jose, and Warm Springs, California. The town of Newark has always refused to merge into Fremont, and Newark is completely surrounded by Fremont.
 Boston, Massachusetts is made up of the former towns of Boston, Dorchester, Brighton, Roxbury, Charlestown, and Hyde Park.
 Iron River, Michigan absorbed the nearby city of Stambaugh and village of Mineral Hills in July 2000.
 Minneapolis, Minnesota. St. Anthony (not to be confused with St. Anthony Village, a modern city which is a suburb) was a twin city to Minneapolis in the two cities' youth. Minneapolis annexed St. Anthony in the late 1800s.
 Park Hills, Missouri was formed in 1994 by a four-way municipal merger involving the cities of Flat River, Elvins, and Esther, plus the village of Rivermines.
 Jersey City, New Jersey, was incorporated in 1820, and slowly grew by annexing surrounding municipalities: Van Vorst Twp. (1851), Bergen City (1869), Hudson City (1869), Bergen Twp. (1869) and finally Greenville Twp. (1873).
 New York City, New York (five boroughs, historically especially between Manhattan and Brooklyn)
 What is now the city of Winston-Salem, North Carolina was once two separate towns called Winston and Salem that were combined into one.
 Cleveland (Cleveland and Ohio City) in Ohio
 Lincoln City, Oregon was formed in 1965 by merging the extant seaside towns of Oceanlake, Delake, and Taft, with the adjoining unincorporated areas of Nelscott and Cutler City.
 Bethlehem, Pennsylvania, which absorbed the cities of South Bethlehem, and West Bethlehem.  The former Bethlehem and South Bethlehem are situated in Northampton County, and West Bethlehem is in Lehigh County.  As a result, present-day Bethlehem straddles the county line.
 Pittsburgh, Pennsylvania, annexed Allegheny City, which is now the quarter of the city that lies north of the Allegheny and Ohio rivers. Also annexed was Birmingham, now referred to as the "South Side".
 Richmond (Richmond and Manchester) in central Virginia
 Bellingham, Washington was formed from four cities, Fairhaven, Sehome, Bellingham and Whatcom.

Fictional twin cities 
 Ankh-Morpork, from Terry Pratchett's Discworld novels, is referred to as "the twin cities of proud Ankh and pestilent Morpork"
 Besźel and Ul Qoma in China Miéville's novel The City & the City are intertwined twin city-states in Eastern Europe whose inhabitants have trained themselves to only see the city they live in and unsee the city they don't.
 Central City and Keystone City, from the current Flash comics, are shown as twin cities. Before the 1985-86 miniseries Crisis on Infinite Earths, Central and Keystone are presented as located in the same space but on different parallel Earths.
 Duckburg and St. Canard were depicted in the cartoon Darkwing Duck as sister cities connected by a bridge, very similar to Oakland and San Francisco.
 Gotham City (the home of Batman) and Metropolis (the home of Superman) have sometimes been presented as twin cities, mainly in 1970s and 1980s stories by DC Comics. In stories presenting them as twin cities, Gotham City and Metropolis are located on opposite sides of a large bay (identified as Delaware Bay in 1990's The Atlas of the DC Universe), with both cities linked by the Metro-Narrows Bridge, a suspension bridge resembling New York City's Verrazano-Narrows Bridge.
 Helium, from the Barsoom series of novels by Edgar Rice Burroughs, consists of the twin cities Greater Helium and Lesser Helium.

See also 
 List of divided cities
 Cross-border town naming
 Megacity
 List of metropolitan areas that overlap multiple countries
 Ecumenopolis
 Metropolis
 Megalopolis
 Sister city

Notes

References